Albin is a town in Laramie County, Wyoming, United States. It is part of the Cheyenne Metropolitan Statistical Area. The population was 181 at the 2010 census.

Geography

Climate

Demographics

2010 census
As of the census of 2010, there were 181 people, 59 households, and 44 families residing in the town. The racial makeup of the town was 93.9% White, 0.6% Native American, 0.6% Asian, 4.4% from other races, and 0.6% from two or more races. Hispanic or Latino of any race were 34.3% of the population.

There were 59 households, of which 42.4% had children under the age of 18 living with them, 50.8% were married couples living together, 10.2% had a female householder with no husband present, 13.6% had a male householder with no wife present, and 25.4% were non-families. 22.0% of all households were made up of individuals, and 6.8% had someone living alone who was 65 years of age or older. The average household size was 3.07 and the average family size was 3.59.

The median age in the town was 28.1 years. 36.5% of residents were under the age of 18; 7.1% were between the ages of 18 and 24; 28.2% were from 25 to 44; 23.7% were from 45 to 64; and 4.4% were 65 years of age or older. The gender makeup of the town was 50.8% male and 49.2% female.

2000 census
As of the census of 2000, there were 120 people, 54 households, and 32 families residing in the town. The population density was 850.6 people per square mile (330.9/km). There were 70 housing units at an average density of 496.2 per square mile (193.1/km). The racial makeup of the town was 95.83% White, 0.83% Native American, 0.83% Asian, 2.50% from other races. Hispanic or Latino of any race were 9.17% of the population.

There were 54 households, out of which 24.1% had children under the age of 18 living with them, 51.9% were married couples living together, 3.7% had a female householder with no husband present, and 38.9% were non-families. 37.0% of all households were made up of individuals, and 22.2% had someone living alone who was 65 years of age or older. The average household size was 2.22 and the average family size was 2.91.

In the town, the population was spread out, with 22.5% under the age of 18, 7.5% from 18 to 24, 20.0% from 25 to 44, 27.5% from 45 to 64, and 22.5% who were 65 years of age or older. The median age was 46 years. For every 100 females, there were 87.5 males. For every 100 females age 18 and over, there were 89.8 males.

The median income for a household in the town was $25,625, and the median income for a family was $38,750. Males had a median income of $26,000 versus $18,750 for females. The per capita income for the town was $13,174. There were 6.7% of families and 12.5% of the population living below the poverty line, including 19.0% of under eighteens and 31.3% of those over 64.

Education
Public education in the town of Albin is provided by Laramie County School District #2. One of the district's campuses, Albin Elementary School, is located in the town and serves students in grades Kindergarten through six.

Albin made news in the regional media for a failed attempt to start a charter school in their town.

See also

 List of municipalities in Wyoming

References

External link

Towns in Laramie County, Wyoming
Towns in Wyoming